Jaipur Watch Company (JWC) is an Indian manufacturer of luxury wristwatches, founded in 2013. It is known for making Indian-themed watches incorporating Pre-British Era coins, postage stamps, Pichhwai paintings, feathers and precious stones. Their factory is located in Peenya, Bengaluru. It is India's first luxury watch brand that also makes custom watches with pictures. The Brand was also featured in Shark tank India Season 2.

History 
Jaipur Watch Company was founded in 2013 by Gaurav Mehta, the current CEO of the company. The company is headquartered in Jaipur, India.

In 2017, the company started manufacturing bespoke and 18-carat gold watches. In November 2018, JWC launched its limited-edition Jump Hour Watch, which paid homage to Gerald Genta, a Swiss watch designer. It opened its first retail store at Select CityWalk, New Delhi in September 2019. Some of its notable clients include the Royal family of Jodhpur and Government of Uttarakhand.

Products 
Jaipur Watch Company began with the Imperial collection in 2013. It manufactures coin watches, bespoke watches, hand-engraved watches, 3D-printed watches, and watches studded with feathers and precious stones. It has launched various collections ranging from a peacock feather-inspired one to a range of pocket watches. Their Imperial Wrist Wear collection includes a dial with one rupee King George VI half silver coin. It has four antique coin watch collections, including Imperial Wristwear, King's Wristwear, Imperial Wristwear II, and Titanium Wristwear.

It also launched a series of Pichhwai Watches, in which the watches have a hand-painted dial painted by miniature artists. The company launched a series of gold watches with an actual postage stamp from 1937 - 1940 as the dial. It has designed the Obama Watch, in which Barack Obama's face is engraved on the dial and the central design draws from the Great Seal of the United States, the official coat of arms of the US.

See also 
 Fastrack 
 List of watch manufacturers
 Titan Company

References

External links 
 

Watch manufacturing companies of India
Indian brands
Watch brands
Fashion accessory brands
2013 establishments in India
2013 establishments in Rajasthan